Caetano Emanuel Viana Teles Veloso (born 7 August 1942) is a Brazilian composer, singer, guitarist, writer, and political activist. Veloso first became known for his participation in the Brazilian musical movement Tropicalismo, which encompassed theatre, poetry and music in the 1960s, at the beginning of the Brazilian military dictatorship that took power in 1964. He has remained a constant creative influence and best-selling performing artist and composer ever since. Veloso has won nine Latin Grammy Awards and two Grammy Awards. On November 14, 2012, Veloso was honored as the Latin Recording Academy Person of the Year.

Veloso was one of seven children born into the family of José Telles Veloso (commonly known as Seu Zeca), a government official, and Claudionor Viana Telles Veloso (known as Dona Canô). He was born in the city of Santo Amaro da Purificação, in Bahia, a state in the eastern area of Brazil, but moved to Salvador, the state capital, as a college student in the mid-1960s. Soon after that, Veloso won a music contest and was signed to his first label. He became one of the founders of Tropicalismo with a group of several other musicians and artists—including his sister Maria Bethânia—in the same period. However, the Brazilian military dictatorship viewed Veloso's music and political action as threatening, and he was arrested, along with fellow musician Gilberto Gil, in 1969. The two eventually were exiled from Brazil and went to London where they lived for two years. In 1972, Veloso moved back to his home country and once again began recording and performing. He later became popular outside Brazil in the 1980s and 1990s.

Biography 

Veloso was born in Santo Amaro da Purificação, Bahia, Brazil, the fifth of seven children of José Teles Veloso (1901–1983) and Claudionor Viana Teles Veloso (1907–2012). His childhood was influenced greatly by artistic endeavors: he was interested in both literature and filmmaking as a child, but focused mainly on music. The musical style of bossa nova and João Gilberto, one of its most prominent exponents, were major influences on Veloso's music as he grew up. Veloso was 17 years old when he first heard Gilberto, whom he describes as his "supreme master". He recognizes Gilberto's contribution to Brazilian music as new—"illuminating" the tradition of Brazilian music and paving the way for future innovation. Veloso moved to the Bahian port city of Salvador as a teenager, the city in which Gilberto lived, and a center of Afro-Brazilian culture and music.

In 1965, Veloso moved again to Rio de Janeiro, with his sister Maria Bethânia, also a musician. Shortly after the move, Veloso won a lyrics contest for his composition "Um Dia" and was signed to Philips Records. On October 21, 1967, Veloso won fourth prize and gained a standing ovation at the third annual Brazil Popular Music Festival with his song "Alegria, Alegria". on which he was backed by São Paulo group Beat Boys; along with the performance of his friend Gilberto Gil, who was backed by psychedelic band Os Mutantes, this marked the first time that rock bands had performed at the festival. During this period, Veloso, Bethânia, Gilberto Gil, Gal Costa, Tom Zé, and Os Mutantes developed "Tropicalismo", which fused Brazilian pop with rock and roll and avant-garde music. Veloso describes the movement as a wish to be different - not "defensive" like the right-wing Brazilian military government, which vehemently opposed the movement. Although Gil and Veloso's performances at the 1967 MBP Festival were rapturously received, within a year, Tropicalismo had become a deeply divisive issue among Brazil's youth audience, with Marxist-influenced college students of the Brazilian left wing condemning Tropicalismo, because they believed it commercialized Brazilian traditional music by incorporating musical influence from other cultures, specifically the United States.

The musical manifesto of the Tropicalist movement was the landmark collaborative LP Tropicália: ou Panis et Circencis ("Tropicalia: or Bread and Circuses"), issued in mid-1968, which brought together the talents of Veloso, Os Mutantes, Gilberto Gil, Tom Zé and Gal Costa, with arrangements by avant-garde composer-arranger Rogerio Duprat (who had studied with Pierre Boulez) and lyrical contributions from poet Torquato Neto. The album's group cover photograph depicted the collective holding a variety of objects and images, in a deliberate reference to the cover of The Beatles' Sgt. Pepper's Lonely Hearts Club Band.

The tensions between the Tropicalistas and the student left peaked in September 1968 with Veloso's now-legendary performances at the third annual International Song Festival, held at the Catholic University in Rio, where the audience included a large contingent of students who were vehemently opposed to the Tropicalistas. When Veloso (backed by Os Mutantes) performed in the first round of the Festival's song competition on September 12, he was initially greeted with enthusiastic applause, but the situation soon turned ugly. Dressed in a shiny green plastic suit, festooned with electrical wires and necklaces strung with animal teeth, Veloso provoked the students with his lurid costume, his sensual body movements and his startling new psychedelic music, and the performers were soon being bombarded with loud insults, jeers and boos from the students, who became even more incensed when American pop singer John Dandurand made a surprise appearance on stage during the song.

The ideological conflict climaxed three days later on September 15 when Veloso returned for the second round of the competition, performing a specially-written new song entitled "É Proibido Proibir" ("It is Forbidden to Forbid"). The leftist students began hissing and booing as soon as Veloso's name was announced, and when he began his performance, his overtly sexual stage moves and the experimental music of Os Mutantes again provoked a wild reaction – the students began booing so loudly that the performers could barely be heard, and a section of the crowd then stood up and turned their backs to the stage, prompting Os Mutantes to turn their backs on the audience. As the performance continued, the students pelted the stage with fruit, vegetables, eggs, paper balls and anything else that came to hand. Veloso then stopped singing and launched into an impassioned monologue, in which he excoriated the students for their conservatism. After being joined by Gilberto Gil, who came on stage to show his support, Veloso finished his diatribe by telling the students "...if you are the same in politics as you are in aesthetics, we’re done for!" and declaring he would no longer compete in music festivals. He then deliberately finished the song out of tune, angrily shouted "Enough!" and walked off arm-in-arm with Gil and Os Mutantes. A studio version of the song was later released as a single, and the closing section of the tumultuous live performance featuring Veloso's speech, was issued as the single's B-side. [103] Even though Tropicalismo was controversial among traditional critics, it introduced to Música popular brasileira new elements for making music with an eclectic style.

Veloso studied philosophy at the Universidade Federal da Bahia, which influenced both his artistic expression and viewpoint on life. Two of his favorite philosophers were Jean-Paul Sartre and Martin Heidegger. Veloso's leftist political stance earned him the enmity of Brazil's military dictatorship which ruled until 1985; his songs were frequently censored and some banned.  Veloso and Gil were both arrested in February 1969 and held in prison for three months, followed by a further four months under house arrest; they were eventually released on condition that they leave the country, and spent the next few years in exile. He said that "they didn't imprison us for any song or any particular thing that we said," ascribing the government's reaction to its unfamiliarity with the cultural phenomenon of Tropicália—they seemed to say "We might as well put them in prison." The federal police detained the two and flew them to an unknown destination. Finally, Veloso and Gil lived out their exile in London, England. When Caetano was asked about his experience there he says, "London felt dark, and I felt far away from myself." Nevertheless, the two improved their music there and were asked to make a musical production with the producer Ralph Mace.

Career

Musical career (1972–present) 

Veloso's work upon his return in 1972 was often characterized by frequent merging not only of international styles but of Brazilian folkloric styles and rhythms as well. His popularity grew outside Brazil in the 1980s, especially in Greece, Portugal, France, and Africa. His records released in the United States, such as Estrangeiro, helped gain him a larger audience.

To celebrate 25 years of Tropicalismo, Veloso and Gilberto Gil released a CD called Tropicalia 2 in 1993. One song, "Haiti", attracted people's attention during the time, especially because it included powerful statements about sociopolitical issues present in Haiti and also in Brazil. Issues addressed in the song included ethnicity, poverty, homelessness, and capital corruption in the AIDS pandemic. By 2004, he was one of the most respected and prolific international pop stars, with more than 50 recordings available including songs in film soundtracks of Michelangelo Antonioni's Eros, Pedro Almodóvar's Hable con ella, and Frida, for which he performed at the 75th Academy Awards but did not win. In 2002 Veloso published an account of his early years and the Tropicalismo movement, Tropical Truth: A Story of Music and Revolution in Brazil.

His first all-English CD was A Foreign Sound (2004), which covers Nirvana's "Come as You Are" and compositions from the Great American Songbook such as "Carioca" (music by Vincent Youmans and lyrics by Edward Eliscu and Gus Kahn), "Always" (music and lyrics by Irving Berlin), "Manhattan" (music by Richard Rodgers and lyrics by Lorenz Hart), "Love for Sale" (music and lyrics by Cole Porter), and "Something Good" (music and lyrics by Richard Rodgers). Six of the seven songs on his third eponymous album, released in 1971, were also in English.

Veloso has contributed songs to two AIDS benefit compilation albums produced by the Red Hot Organization: Red Hot + Rio (1996) and Onda Sonora: Red Hot + Lisbon (1998).

In 2011, he again contributed two songs to the Red Hot Organization's most recent compilation album, Red Hot + Rio 2. The two tracks include a remix of "Terra" by Prefuse 73 ("3 Mellotrons in a Quiet Room Version") and "Dreamworld: Marco de Canaveses”, in collaboration with David Byrne.

His September 2006 album, Cê, was released by Nonesuch Records in the United States. It won two Latin Grammy Awards, one for best singer-songwriter and one for Best Portuguese Song, "Não Me Arrependo".

With a total of nine Latin Grammy Awards and two Grammy Awards, Veloso has received more than any other Brazilian performer. On November 14, 2012, Veloso was also honored as the Latin Recording Academy Person of the Year.

Veloso has been called "one of the greatest songwriters of the century" and "a pop musician/poet/filmmaker/political activist whose stature in the pantheon of international pop musicians is on par with that of Bob Dylan, Bob Marley, and Lennon/McCartney".

In January 2016, Caetano Veloso was a featured artist at the convention of the Modern Language Association (MLA), in Austin, Texas. Before a SRO crowd, he was interviewed on stage by two luminaries in the field of poetry and poetics, Marjorie Perloff (emerita Stanford) and Roland Greene (Stanford, President of MLA at the time). Most of the discussion concerned music, from rock 'n' roll and samba to experimental composition. Videos of the event should be posted at MLA's site and the Stanford Arcade site. He also performed "Isto aqui, o que é?" at the 2016 Summer Olympics opening ceremony along with singers Anitta and Gilberto Gil after the parade of delegations in August 2016.

In May 2018, Veloso performed at the Grand Final of the 2018 Eurovision Song Contest in the Portuguese capital, Lisbon, alongside 2017 winner Salvador Sobral. His live album Ofertório (Ao Vivo) (recorded with his sons Moreno, Zeca and Tom) was ranked as the 25th best Brazilian album of 2018 by the Brazilian edition of Rolling Stone magazine.

Personal life 
Veloso married fellow Baiana and actress Andrea Gadelha (or Dedé) on November 21, 1967, in a ceremony that reflected the air of the counterculture era. Their son Moreno was born on November 22, 1972. On January 7, 1979, their daughter Júlia was born 3 months premature; she died 11 days later. Veloso's father died on December 13, 1983. Veloso separated from Dedé Veloso in 1983. In 1986 Veloso married Rio native Paula Lavigne, with whom he had two more sons, Zeca Lavigne Veloso, born March 7, 1992, and Tom Lavigne Veloso, born on January 25, 1997, in Salvador. Paula confirmed to Playboy magazine in 1998 that, "[Paula] was 13 years old when she lost her virginity to the musician, who was 40 years old at the time." Caetano has since been accused of pedophilia. This marriage lasted twenty years. Although separated since 2004, the two still work together. Veloso's 1989 CD Estrangeiro includes songs ("Esse Amor, which means "This Love", and "Branquinha") inspired by and dedicated to, respectively, his ex-wife Dedé and his wife at the time, Paula Lavigne.

Veloso is one of the few public atheist celebrities in Brazil. He was brought up in a religious Catholic family but left the faith early on. In an interview Veloso stated that he did not like to "lie to his own intelligence" by believing in God. In a separate interview Veloso generated controversy when he said that Brazil would be better off if most people in the country were to become irreligious or atheist. Despite this, two of Veloso's sons have become members of the neo-Pentecostal Universal Church of the Kingdom of God, with Veloso attending his children's baptism, stating that "what is good for them is good for me."

In 2022 Veloso talked about his bisexuality in a show commemorating his 80th birthday.

Musical style
Veloso's home, Bahia, has had a decisive role in his music. He praises Bahia for its importance in Brazil's colonial period—when the Portuguese first came—as well as for Bahia's contribution to Brazilian music.  He has cited among his musical influences Amália Rodrigues, Cole Porter, the Rolling Stones 1969 tour, and above all, João Gilberto.

Veloso says that he is unable to make a comparison between his musical style in the 1960s, at the height of Tropicália, and his current work. He does note, however, that he has been able to accomplish music of a higher quality later in his career; that he is "better at everything."

Discography

Studio albums
1967: Domingo
1968: Caetano Veloso
1968: Tropicália: ou Panis et Circenses
1968: Veloso, Gil e Bethânia
1969: Caetano Veloso
1971: Caetano Veloso
1972: Transa
1972: Araçá Azul
1975: Qualquer Coisa
1975: Jóia
1977: Caetano... muitos carnavais...
1977: Bicho
1978: Muito
1979: Cinema Transcendental
1981: Outras Palavras
1981: Brasil (João Gilberto album featuring Caetano Veloso, Gilberto Gil and Maria Bethânia)
1982: Cores, Nomes
1983: Uns
1984: Velô
1986: Caetano Veloso
1987: Caetano
1989: Estrangeiro
1991: Circuladô
1993: Tropicália 2 (with Gilberto Gil)
1994: Fina Estampa
1998: Livro
2000: Noites do Norte
2002: Eu Não Peço Desculpa (with Jorge Mautner)
2004: A Foreign Sound
2005: Onqotô
2006: Cê
2008: Caetano Veloso e Roberto Carlos – e a Música de Tom Jobim
2009: Zii e Zie
2012: Abraçaço
2021: Meu Coco

Live albums
1968: Ao Vivo (with Os Mutantes)
1972: Barra 69 ao Vivo na Bahia (with Gilberto Gil)
1972: Caetano e Chico – juntos e ao vivo (with Chico Buarque)
1974: Temporada de Verão – Ao Vivo na Bahia (with Gal Costa and Gilberto Gil)
1976: Doces Bárbaros (with Gal Costa, Gilberto Gil, and Maria Bethânia)
1977: Bicho Baile Show (with Banda Black Rio)
1978: Maria Bethânia e Caetano Veloso ao Vivo (with Maria Bethânia)
1986: Totalmente Demais
1992: Circuladô Vivo
1994: Fina Estampa ao Vivo
1999: Prenda Minha
1999: Omaggio a Federico e Giulietta
2001: Noites do Norte ao Vivo
2002: Live in Bahia
2007: Cê ao Vivo
2011: MTV ao Vivo – Caetano – Zii e Zie
2011: Caetano e Maria Gadú Multishow ao Vivo (with Maria Gadú)
2012: Live at Carnegie Hall (recorded in 2004 with David Byrne)
2013: Abraçaço ao Vivo
2016: Dois Amigos (Caetano Veloso and Gilberto Gil)
2018: Ofertorio
2020: Caetano Veloso & Ivan Sacerdote

Soundtracks
1995: O Quatrilho
1996: Tieta of Agreste
1999: Orfeu
2002: Talk to Her (Hable con ella) (song "Cucurrucucú paloma", live)
2002: Frida 
2004: Meu Tio Matou um Cara
2004: Eros 
2006: Nacho Libre
2007: Ó Paí, Ó
2008: Romance
2016: Moonlight ("Cucurrucucú paloma")

Compilations
1996: Red Hot + Rio, AIDS-Benefit Album produced by the Red Hot Organization, contributor on track "É Preciso Perdoar"
1998: Onda Sonora: Red Hot + Lisbon, AIDS-Benefit Album produced by the Red Hot Organization, contributor on track "Dreamworld: Marco de Canaveses"
2002: Todo Caetano (box set)

Awards and honors

References

Bibliography
Perrone, Charles A. (1989), Masters of Contemporary Brazilian Song: MPB 1965–1985. Austin: University of Texas Press. Chapter 2 "Other Words and Other Worlds of Caetano Veloso".

 De Stefano, Gildo, Il popolo del samba, La vicenda e i protagonisti della storia della musica popolare brasiliana, Preface by Chico Buarque de Hollanda, Introduction by Gianni Minà, RAI-ERI, Rome 2005, 
 De Stefano, Gildo, Saudade Bossa Nova: musiche, contaminazioni e ritmi del Brasile, Preface by Chico Buarque, Introduction by Gianni Minà, Firenze: Logisma Editore, 2017,

External links

 Official site
 Caetano Veloso Matrix Page
 Caetano Veloso discography  on Slipcue.com
 Caetano Veloso, "Zii e zie" by Billboard
 Caetano Veloso Album Guide
Caetano Veloso Performing live
 Caetano Veloso performs "Alegria, Alegria" at the 3rd Festival de Música Popular Brasileira da TV (1967)
 
 
 
 

1942 births
Living people
People from Bahia
Brazilian male guitarists
Brazilian singer-songwriters
Música Popular Brasileira guitarists
Música Popular Brasileira singers
Latin music songwriters
Tropicalia guitarists
Tropicalia singers
English-language singers from Brazil
Spanish-language singers of Brazil
PolyGram artists
RCA Records artists
Former Roman Catholics
Brazilian atheists
Brazilian exiles
Brazilian expatriates in the United Kingdom
Musicians from London
20th-century guitarists
21st-century guitarists
20th-century Brazilian male singers
20th-century Brazilian singers
21st-century Brazilian male singers
21st-century Brazilian singers
Grammy Award winners
Latin Grammy Award winners
Latin Recording Academy Person of the Year honorees
Brazilian male singer-songwriters
Brazilian people of Portuguese descent
Afro-Brazilian people
Brazilian people of indigenous peoples descent
Nonesuch Records artists
Bisexual musicians
Brazilian LGBT singers
LGBT people in Latin music
Brazilian bisexual people